The Virginia Tech Corps of Cadets (VTCC) is the military component of the student body at Virginia Polytechnic Institute and State University. Cadets live together in residence halls, attend morning formation, wear a distinctive uniform, and receive an intensive military and leadership educational experience similar to that available at the United States service academies. The Corps of Cadets has existed from the founding of the Virginia Agricultural and Mechanical College in 1872 to the present-day institution of Virginia Tech, which is designated a senior military college by federal law. As of August 2021, about 1,200 cadets are currently enrolled in the program.

Overview 
The Corps provides leadership training for all of its cadets through two tracks: a Military-Leader Track for cadets enrolled in one of the three Reserve Officer Training Corps (ROTC) programs, and the Citizen-Leader Track for cadets wishing to pursue civilian sector careers. Students in the Military-Leader track can pursue a commission in the Army, Navy, Marine Corps, or Air Force. 

All cadets have the opportunity to receive an academic minor in Leadership through the Rice Center for Leader Development which is in the Virginia Tech Pamplin College of Business. To earn the minor, cadets must complete 22 academic credits, have three successful leadership positions, and pass their graduating-year physical fitness test.

Around 75% of the Corps' graduates choose the Military-Leader Track. If a cadet is enrolled in an ROTC program at Virginia Tech, they must also be enrolled in the Corps of Cadets. However, a cadet does not have to be enrolled in an ROTC program in order to participate in the Corps. There are a few exceptions made for active duty enlisted students participating in programs like the Army's Green to Gold program. However, ROTC cadets may compete for four-, three-, and two-year ROTC scholarship opportunities that typically pay tuition, fees, an amount towards books, and a monthly stipend that ranges from $250 per month to $500 per month.

The remaining cadets choose the Citizen-Leader Track to pursue civilian careers or officer training or officer candidate training programs after graduation, or attend professional or graduate schools. Eighty-three percent of the Citizen-Leader Track cadets had a job or graduate school offer in hand upon graduation in May 2016. Recently, Northrop Grumman funded six scholarships for Citizen-Leader Track cadets or Military-Leader Track cadets not on scholarship which included an opportunity to intern with Northrop Grumman as well. Citizen-Leader Track cadets participate in an exercise called Job-Ex, where the junior and senior cadets learn to write a job description, freshman and sophomore cadets apply to those jobs, the upperclass cadets review them, and then they conduct panel interviews with the underclass cadets, so they can learn from their peers what is successful in an job interview. The upperclass cadets learn what interviewers expect, so they can improve their interviewing skills as well. The Rice Center Board of Advisors, made up from executives from organizations like Northrop Grumman, Union Pacific, Dell, the Defense Intelligence Agency, and the Federal Bureau of Investigation, advise the Corps staff on curriculum and skill sets cadets need to develop to be more employable after graduation.

Women entered the VTCC in the fall of 1973 and created a single unit called L Squadron. By 1979, women were integrated into the line companies, though they still lived separately from the males in their units. In 1981, the residence halls became co-ed and women began to live in the same unit area as their male counterparts. In 1987, the first female Regimental Commanding Officer (CO) was appointed. To date, the Corps has had 4 female Regimental Commanding Officers. Today the Corps is at least 20% female and women hold leadership positions throughout the Corps.

History

Early years of the Corps

On October 1, 1872, Virginia Tech opened as the Virginia Agricultural and Mechanical College (VAMC). All students were cadets organized into a battalion of two companies with an enrollment of 132. The Commandant of Cadets was General James H. Lane, formerly the youngest general in the Army of Northern Virginia, who was wounded three times in combat. He worked to provide both the best education and the best military training in the state for his cadets based on his experience in the Civil War, and as a student and teacher at VMI and UVA, and as a teacher at Florida State Seminary and North Carolina Military Institute.

Lane is considered the father of the Corps. He wrote the first cadet regulations and began the tradition of academic and military excellence. In 1878, VAMC President Charles Minor wanted to do away with the strict military requirements. Lane opposed him and their disagreement became so heated that a faculty meeting ended with a fistfight between the two. Both left campus in the ensuing scandal, but the Corps remained.

The VAMC cadets made their first Corps trip in 1875 to Richmond to the dedication of the Lee Monument. Over the years, the Corps has made many trips. These trips were more frequent in the early years including the Pan-American Exposition in Buffalo, New York in 1901 and the St. Louis World's Fair in 1904. In 1880, political mismanagement from Richmond contributed to enrollment dropping to just 78 cadets. But in the ensuing years, enrollment and educational opportunities were expanded. E Battery, manning four Civil War artillery pieces with upper classmen, existed between 1883 and 1907.

In 1896, VAMC, through an act of the Virginia Legislature, changed its name to the Virginia Agricultural and Mechanical College and Polytechnic Institute. The name was quickly abbreviated in common usage to VPI. Also that same year, a tradition began that lasted nearly three-quarters of a century, the VPI-VMI annual football game in Roanoke. Known as the Military Classic of the South, the annual Corps trips and associated parades ended in 1970.

Spanish–American War service
In 1898, with the outbreak of the Spanish–American War, the VPI Corps of Cadets formally volunteered to the governor for combat service. This request was declined, but most of the VPI Cadet band and their director enlisted as the Band of the 2nd Virginia Infantry Regiment. Many alumni served in the Spanish–American War and the Philippine–American War. One alumnus (A.M. Gaujot. Class of 1901) was awarded the Medal of Honor during the Philippine–American War and another cited for gallantry at the Battle of Santiago de Cuba. The Gaujot brothers remain the only two brothers in American history to receive the Medal of Honor for actions in two separate wars.

The VPI Cadet Band had first been organized in 1892. Prior to that, as early as 1883, music was provided by the "Glade Cornet Band," an organization made up of townspeople. The summer of 1902 saw the VPI Cadet Band serve as part of the 70th Virginia Infantry during large-scale national military maneuvers held in Manassas, Virginia. The VPI Cadet Band has been referred to as the Highty-Tighties since 1921.

World War I
Before U.S. entry into World War I, the ROTC (Reserve Officer Training Corps) was established at Virginia Tech. The Infantry unit was established 21 December 1916. During the war, Virginia Tech essentially became an army post. Cadets were inducted and became enlisted men of the Student Army Training Corps and its Navy detachment. They wore Army and Navy uniforms during this period. Two Army training detachments of between 226 and 308 men each operated on campus.

Captain J. W. G. Stephens (class of 1915), of the 26th Infantry, led the first American forces "over on top" in combat near Montdidier, France. Many alumni served with distinction with the 1st, 2nd, 29th, and 80th Divisions, all of which saw heavy combat. Note must be made of Major Lloyd W. Williams (class of 1907), US Marine Corps. One of the famous quotes of the war, used for years as a Marine standard, was attributed to him. "Retreat, Hell No!" was his reply to the French orders to retreat his company. His company held its ground, but he was killed in the action and awarded the Distinguished Service Cross. In the air, alumni, even as World War I foreshadowed VPI's contribution to the Air Force, CPL Robert G. Eoff (class of 1918), French Foreign Legion, attached to the 157 French Fighter Squadron shot down the first of 6 enemy aircraft credited to Techmen. LT John R. Castleman (class of 1919) was awarded the Distinguished Service Cross (United States) for heroism in completing an aerial reconnaissance in spite of the attack of 12 enemy aircraft, two of which he shot down.

VPI's contribution to the war effort during World War I included 2,297 men in uniform. These included 2,155 in the Army, 125 in the Navy, 19 in the Marine Corps, 6 in the Coast Guard, 1 in the British Army and 1 in the French Foreign Legion. One alumnus (Earle D. Gregory, Class of 1921) was awarded the Medal of Honor, seven the Distinguished Service Cross (United States), and one the Navy Cross. At least eight were awarded the Silver Star. Twenty-six died in service and another twenty-six were wounded. Based on this, VPI was designated as one of twelve 'Distinguished Colleges' by the War Department.

Coast Artillery and Engineer ROTC units were established on the campus 29 December 1919. After World War I, veterans affected the Corps and VPI at large, both as new and returning cadets. In 1921, women were admitted to VPI as civilian students and attended classes as day students. The next year the Corps was reorganized into a regiment of two battalions. Two years later (1923) military service as a cadet was reduced from four years to two; however, after two years of the camaraderie of Corps life very few cadets chose to convert to civilian student status. During the national rail strike of 1923 the corps again volunteered to the Virginia Governor for active military service. They were not called upon.

A Third Battalion was added to the regiment by 1927. Rapid growth followed as Virginia Tech's reputation as both an outstanding academic and military institution grew. In 1939, a Fourth Battalion was added.

World War II

During World War II, academic sessions and the Corps operated on a twelve-month cycle. The Corps had grown to a brigade of 2,650 cadets consisting of two regiments with a total of five battalions. The First Battalion was primarily Infantry ROTC. The Second Battalion was Engineer ROTC and the Third, Fourth and Fifth consisted of Cadet Batteries taking Coast Artillery ROTC. Because of the war, seniors were graduated and commissioned early. Juniors were on an accelerated schedule and brought on active duty. Finally, sophomores and freshmen over 18 were largely inducted into military service. The Corps soon numbered under 300 and was organized into a single battalion.

During the war, the Commandant of Cadets, in addition to the cadet battalion, supervised a unit of the Army Specialized Training Program and Army Specialized Training Reserve Program (ASTRP) (soldiers under 18 years of age) and a Navy pre-flight-training unit. These units included many former cadets, and adopted many of the traditions of the Corps, including the Honor Code and saluting the Rock. The young men of the ASRTP were actually uniformed in cadet gray. Once again VPI was largely an active duty military installation.

Edward H. "Buddy" Dance, of Roanoke, was the President of the Corps of Cadets in the graduating class of 1942. He was, along with other seniors, graduated early. Dance was commissioned as a second lieutenant in the Army Air Corps, but quickly rose to the rank of Major in the Air Force. He flew many missions and then taught others how to fly and fight in the air.

During World War II, 7,285 alumni served in uniform. The army had 5,941 men, the navy 1,095, 110 in the Marine Corps, 29 in the Merchant Marine, 23 in the Coast Guard, and one in the Royal Air Force. These included ten Brigadier Generals, five Major Generals, and one Rear Admiral. Three hundred twenty-three died, five were awarded the Medal of Honor, seven the Distinguished Service Cross, two the Navy Cross, at least 73 the Silver Star, and 94 the Distinguished Flying Cross.

Following World War II, returning veterans were not required to serve in the Corps and the great influx of veterans swelled the number of civilian students. Civilian students out-numbered cadets for the first time in 1946. That same year Air Force ROTC was introduced to Virginia Tech. Initially civilian-cadet relations were not good as most veterans were attending Virginia Tech for the first time. Thanks to the regimental commander, Cadet Robertson (class of 1949), a World War II Coast Guard veteran, greater understanding was promoted among his fellow veterans and the Corps continued to grow and flourish.

During the following years the Corps would expand again back to a regiment and eventually organize into four battalion-size units. The Cadet 1st Battalion was housed at Radford Army Arsenal for two years at "Rad-Tech."  There, in World War II Army barracks, the cadets lived and took many of their classes. For unavailable classes, a fleet of buses brought them back to the main campus. As new dorms were completed the battalion returned to campus.

Korean War
During the Korean War, 1,867 corps alumni served, of whom 30 died in service. During the war, First Lieutenant Richard Thomas Shea, Jr. (Class of 1949) received the Medal of Honor posthumously for his actions at Pork Chop Hill as a company commander. In 1952, the university employed a retired general as the Commandant of Cadets. This was a departure from policy since 1884, where the senior active duty military instructor functioned as commandant.

1950s, 1960s, and 1970s
In 1958, Virginia Tech became the first traditionally white southern college to graduate an African American, with the graduation of Cadet Charles Yates (class of 1958).

In a move to expand educational opportunities at Virginia Tech, the board of visitors made participation in the Corps completely voluntary starting in 1964. However, participation in ROTC continued to also require Corps membership. The Vietnam War period saw unrest on campus outside the Corps ranks. In 1970 demonstrations were conducted with the aim of halting Corps drill. Cowgill and Williams Hall were occupied and over 100 students were arrested. Other incidents occurred including the suspected arson of an on-campus building. Civilian-cadet relations were at an all-time low. Throughout all of this, the Corps maintained discipline and high esprit.

The post-Vietnam years saw the Corps numbers decline and reorganization to a two-battalion sized regiment. In 1973, Virginia Tech was among the first Corps of Cadets in the nation to enroll women, assigning them to L Squadron. In 1975, the first female cadet was assigned to Band Company. In 1979, L Squadron was disbanded and female cadets were integrated into the line companies. In 1991, the Cadet dormitories became co-ed.

1980s and beyond

The freshman "Rat System" converted to the "New Cadet System" in the fall of 1981. Naval ROTC was established in 1983. The cadet regiment expanded to a three-battalion structure in 1998, which grew to four in 2022. Today the Virginia Tech Corps of Cadets is one of six senior military colleges outside the five federal military academies. Virginia Tech is one of only three universities in the nation that maintains a full-time military environment within a larger civilian university; the others are Texas A&M and University of North Georgia.

Since the Spanish–American War, the Corps has provided officers to the U.S. military. The valor of Corps alumni is legendary, with seven Medal of Honor recipients, and eighteen recipients of the nation's second highest award for valor, the Distinguished Service Cross or Navy Cross. The Corps exemplifies in many ways the University motto, Ut Prosim (That I May Serve).

Structure and operations

The Virginia Tech Corps of Cadets is a cadet-run organization, consisting of over 1,200 members (as of fall 2021), and is modeled on an Army infantry regiment structure. The Corps is supervised by a senior leadership staff who establish cadet regulations and enforce baseline guidance for the running of the Corps. The day-to-day corps activities, however, are run primarily by the cadets themselves.

Current structure

All companies are co-ed and integrated with members of all tracks offered within the Corps. When a cadet first joins the Corps, they are assigned to a smaller training company attached to its larger parent company. Following their freshman year, cadets are shuffled into a different company in which they will remain until they graduate from the Corps of Cadets. In most cases, a cadet's permanent company is in a different battalion than that of their freshman training company. 

In some companies, the freshmen section are often given their own nicknames such as TC 1-1 for Alpha Company freshmen, DEUCE DEUCE for Foxtrot freshman, and colloquially mini golf and little Mike for freshmen in those respective companies. It is customary for graduates of the Corps to refer to themselves by the letter of their permanent company as well as their graduating year (e.g. N-25, A-86, etc.). 

Companies also have nicknames, such as the Foxtrot Panthers, however since the VTCC is currently a single regiment, no companies have the same letter destination and thus the nicknames are seldom used compared to company nicknames at West Point or Texas A&M. Some companies have two mascots, where each platoon is named after one of the mascots.

Due to changing company ROTC affiliations between US Army Infantry/Engineers, Coast Artillery, and Air Corps (later US Air Force) ROTCs, units were designated as Companies, Batteries, and Squadrons respectively.

Between the Spring and Fall semesters of 1971, due to dwindling numbers, the number of units was cut in half, to avoid favoring units at the front of the line, all Companies, Batteries, and Squadrons were divided into pairs, with each pair  constituting a new company. This updated lineage carries on to this day, even as units were “reactivated” beginning with India in the reconstituted 3rd Battalion, which was fully restored with the activation of Mike company in 2021. The Fourth battalion was reactivated in 2022, along with N and O Companies. 

It is important to note that when the companies I through O were reactivated, the reorganization of 1971 was not undone, essentially meaning that two units in the regiments (One company and one platoon) can claim the legacy of the letters I,K,L,M,N, and O. This also means that technically, these six companies can trace their lineage to an older date than the companies currently designated A through H.

Senior leadership
The senior leadership is provided by the Commandant of Cadets, who is appointed by Virginia Tech and is a paid faculty member. The Commandant is typically a retired major general from either the Army or Air Force. Of note, the Corps has never had a Commandant from the Navy or the Marine Corps. The Commandant of Cadets is assisted by an executive officer in administrative matters and coordination with a number of university constituencies.

Other Corps leadership staff are the four Deputy Commandants who, along with four Senior Enlisted Advisors, oversee the cadet battalions along with one Deputy Commandant and an Assistant Deputy Commandant for the Citizen-Leader Track. There is also a Director of Alumni Development with an administrative assistant, and an Assistant Deputy Commandant for Recruiting.  A Director of Communications coordinates communication efforts amongst the Corps' many audiences, and two Residential Life Coordinators are also assigned to the Corps in order to liaison between the Office of Housing and Residence Life and the Corps.  The Director of the Rice Center for Leadership Studies oversees the leadership minor and curriculum for the cadets. The Director of the Regimental Band, the Highty Tighties, is also a member of the Commandant's Staff. Also assigned are a Museum Curator, an athletic trainer (provided by Carilion),  and two office and one scholarship manager. The Commandant of Cadets also oversees operation of the university's Tailor Shop.

Commandants of Cadets

a"From the day of its founding to the present Virginia Polytechnic Institute and State University has had a commandant of cadets. The session of 1880-1882 is unique however. The Board of Visitors failed to appoint either a commandant or a president. Acting President Hart thereupon appointed a senior cadet as acting commandant and permitted this individual to select other seniors as acting assistant commandants. With this one exception all commandants have been appointed by the Board of Visitors."

Cadet leadership
The Virginia Tech Corps of Cadets is organized in a way that is comparable to that of an army regiment. Each organizational level within the Corps has numerous additional staff billets. These can range from that of the regiment's inspector general to fire team leaders who report to their respective platoons and companies. 

Regimental Staff
 Regimental Commander (C/COL)
 Regimental Executive Officer (C/LTC)
 S-1 [Adjutant] (C/MAJ)
 S-2 [Public Affairs] (C/MAJ)
 S-3 [Operations] (C/LTC)
 S-33 [Current Operations] (C/MAJ)
 S-35 [Future Operations] (C/MAJ)
 S-37 [Training] (C/MAJ)
 S-4 [Logistics] (C/MAJ)
 S-5 [Academics]  (C/MAJ)
 S-6 [Communications] (C/MAJ)
 Command Sergeant Major  (C/CSM)

Regimental Special Staff
 Regimental Safety (C/MAJ)
 Regimental Athletics (C/CPT)
 Regimental Recruiting (C/CPT)
 Regimental Religious Liaison (C/CPT)
 Regimental Alumni Liaison (C/CPT)
 Regimental Inspector General (C/MAJ)
 Liaison to Cadet Organizations (C/CPT)

 Army Battalion Commander (C/LTC)
 Navy Battalion Commander (C/LTC)
 Air Force Detachment Commander (C/LTC)
 VPI Battalion Commander (C/LTC)
 Honor Court Chief Justice (C/MAJ)
 Staff Judge Advocate (C/MAJ)
 Growley Captain (C/CPT)
 Regimental Handler (C/SFC)
 Gregory Guard Commander (C/CPT)
 Color Guard Commander (C/CCS)
 Skipper Crew Gun Captain (C/CPT)
 Skipper Crew Chief of Smoke (C/ASG)
 Regimental Armorer (C/CPT)
 Regimental Bugler (C/CSS)
 Regimental Historian (Rank varies)
 Regimental Medic (Rank varies)
 VTCC Director Hall Council (Rank varies)
 Regimental Photographer (Rank varies)

Battalion Staff
 Battalion Commander (C/LTC)
 Battalion Executive Officer (C/MAJ)
 S-1 [Adjutant] (C/CPT)
 S-2 [Public Affairs] (C/CPT)
 S-3 [Operations] (C/MAJ)
 S-33 [Current Operations] (C/CPT)
 S-35 [Future Operations] (C/CPT)
 S-37 [Training] (C/CPT)
 S-4 [Logistics] (C/CPT)
 S-5 [Academics] (C/CPT)
 Battalion Sergeant Major (C/SGM)
 Physical Training Instructor (C/1LT)
 Safety (C/1LT)
 Recruiting (C/1LT)
 Inspector General (C/1LT)

Company Staff
 Company Commander (C/CPT)
 Company Executive Officer (C/1LT)
 Company First Sergeant (C/1SG)

Rank structure

"New Cadet" is the standard rank for all freshman upon entrance into the cadet corps. After the first six weeks, freshmen are granted the rank "Cadet." Historically, Some second semester freshmen were selected for the rank of Cadet Private, but they still wore a white cloth belt in contrast to Cadet Privates of other classes, who wear a black belt as an upperclassman but were sanctioned for various reasons. Selection of freshmen for the rank of Cadet Private last took place in the spring of 2018. A rank of "Cadet Private First Class" has occasionally existed for Cadet Privates with a high grade point average.  In the early 2000s, the "Cadet Private First Class" rank was also issued to second semester freshman, who then technically outranked upperclassmen Cadet Privates, this practice was discontinued throughout the 2010s. In the spring of 2022, Second Battalion chose to revive the rank, designating it to members of the freshmen members of each company's Eager Squad.

Cadets who do not hold a position associated with specific ranks are put at a default rank depending on their class year. Sophomores receive Cadet Corporal, juniors receive Cadet Sergeant, and seniors receive Cadet Second Lieutenant unless otherwise directed by sanctions or special circumstances. All seniors, regardless of billet, are designated as officers within the corps and likewise hold privileges associated with the status. This primarily includes parts of their uniforms such as having distinctive gold chinstraps, sabres, and single cross-belts. Fifth year seniors are referred to as "Skipper Cadets" or "Skippers" and wear a silver chin strap. A cadet of any class year who commits a serious infraction may be reduced in rank, often to Cadet Private. 

</noinclude>
</noinclude>
</noinclude>
</noinclude>

Cadet life

Cadets at Virginia Tech are integrated within a larger civilian institution, much like that of Texas A&M. This means that, excluding corps-specific classes and events, cadets interact with other students in classes, dining halls, clubs, greek life, and most other aspects of college life. Weekend leisure time afforded to cadets is heavily dependent on one's ROTC track, the football season schedule, and pre-planned regimental activities like pass in review. 
Cadets are required to live in corps barracks primarily within the campus' Upper Quad. Due to enrollment growth, recent classes of cadets have also lived in other parts of campus while new residence halls are being constructed. Cadets live on a strictly regimented schedule during the week. This typically involves waking up early for physical training and morning formation. Room and uniform inspections can also be expected, with the frequency of them determined by one's class. Freshman and sophomore cadets are given a curfew on weekdays in the form of evening call to quarters (ECQ). The presence of a military environment is intended to create a high degree of personal responsibility and discipline within every cadet. Cadets with more experience receive more personal freedom as well as increased responsibilities.

Freshman training system

Freshmen in the Corps of Cadets (also known as First-Year Cadets, New Cadets, 4/C Cadets, or "Rats") undergo a strenuous process of adapting to the military environment embodied by the Corps. This usually takes place over the course of a cadet's first academic year, though transfers from both in and outside of the university also undergo this training system regardless of their academic status. Transfer students typically join their true academic class during subsequent years. Occasionally, a transfer cadet with only 4 remaining semesters may forego the second semester of their first year training in a process known as "early turning." 

The life of a first-year cadet consists of many class-based restrictions. Most notably, these cadets are expected to both “drag” (briskly march on the right side of all halls and walkways) and sound off to all upperclassmen on the Upper Quad until they officially turn. Other “privileges” may be assigned based on the performance of an individual unit, which may be positive or negative in nature. These often include minor corrective actions like losing the right to use abbreviations, pockets, or particular facing movements when dragging.

Before classes
Prospective first-year cadets are required to arrive one week before the start of classes for training, also known as New Cadet Week. During this week, the new cadets are trained in drill with and without a weapon and also receive physical training to help prepare them for the rigors of leadership and the upcoming stresses of the academic year. The week ends with the New Cadet Parade, where the new cadets march under arms for their families and university staff, as well as a crowd of friends and fellow Virginia Tech students moving on to campus. The parade is intended to display the change in the new cadets and their acquisition of military knowledge and discipline . After this event, new cadets are given approximately 30 hours of pass so they can stay overnight off-campus with their families. However, beginning with the freshman class of 2026, New Cadets will be attending university and college information and academic sessions to prepare them for the start of the semester as part of Virginia Tech’s “Weeks of Welcome” programming. Following NCW the returning upperclass who were not cadre, cadre training assistants, Color Guardsmen, Highty-Tighties, Commanders and their Staffs, Obstacle Course Team, Rappel Tower Committee, Skipper Crew, and Medical Staff move into their rooms.

Red Phase
The cadet training system at Virginia Tech has evolved throughout the decades, with each iteration seeking to improve the quality of leader produced by the program.  Beginning with the class of 2004, the current cadet training system was implemented. The new cadets officially begin Red Phase upon returning from pass at 1830 (6:30 pm) for their first study hours Sunday evening. A freshman cadet typically has eight-and-a-half hours of unstructured time during a weekday in which to attend classes, study, run errands, and workout. Red Phase, like the color red, is the most intense phase, and the new cadets continue to be trained by their cadre (juniors and seniors who were specifically trained to train the freshmen). They will be expected to learn topics from The Guidon, the Virginia Tech Corps of Cadets book of knowledge and will be quizzed on topics from the Guidon during "Freshmen Online", more commonly referred to as "onlines". Onlines are conducted Monday through Friday and last for one-half hour, However, as of the fall 2020 semester, freshmen training on weekdays has ceased with the exception of ROTC instruction. Onlines typically went away at the end of Red Phase. In addition to onlines, freshmen will begin having pass (also known as U-pass or Unity pass) every weekend night, where the cadre will conduct rigorous training reminiscent of New Cadet Week. Common activities during weekend pass include Guidon quizzes, physical training with and without rifles, dragging with and without rifles, and changing into uniforms or remaking beds under time constraints.

The Caldwell March I is named after Addison Caldwell, who walked  to enroll as the first student at Virginia Agriculture and Mechanical College (V.A.M.C.) (Virginia Tech). The march commemorates Addison's historic journey and is broken into two  hikes. The fall hike begins at the Caldwell Homestead in Craig County and loosely follows the original hike along parts of the Appalachian Trail, before ending at a park named after the Caldwell brothers, "Caldwell fields". Homer Hickam, a former cadet, and co-creator of Skipper sometimes joins the cadets on this momentous hike. The successful completion of the fall hike marks the end of the red phase for the first year cadets. 

It is the Virginia Tech Board of Visitors' policy, that any freshman or transfer cadet who leaves the Corps before the end of Red Phase (which is usually defined by the university's last day to withdraw without penalty in the fall semester), must leave the university and begin again in the spring semester (they do not have to re-apply to the university for admission).

White Phase
White Phase begins after the Caldwell March in October and lasts until the conclusion of Military Weekend in February. During White Phase, freshman cadets attend Cadet Leader School taught by the Commandant's Staff and upperclassman cadets. During the Thursday afternoon period reserved normally for the Corps of Cadets lab, freshmen are educated in leadership responsibilities and role play scenarios to learn solutions to different situations.  White Phase normally terminates at the annual Military Ball during Military Weekend (typically in the middle of February). During White Phase, weekend passes are still conducted by the cadre, however based on the previous week's performance pass may be something enjoyable such as a group trip to a movie theater.

Blue Phase
At the beginning of Blue Phase, freshmen cadets are awarded new privileges and continue in their transition from follower-ship to leadership.  Freshman cadets are evaluated during this time for their competence as Fire Team Leaders.  Marking the end of freshmen cadet training year is the second half of the Caldwell March.  After successful completion of the march, the freshman cadets are "turned" to upperclassman status for the remainder of the year.  During this period, the freshman cadets will be partially integrated into their future companies, providing them with valuable acclimation time in order to prepare themselves for their sophomore challenges.

The Caldwell March II is the final march freshmen cadets will do before they turn and become upperclassmen. At the end of the march, all cadets will be at the VT to congratulate the completion of the freshmen cadets' march.

Organizations

In addition to being involved in all other clubs the university has to offer, the Virginia Tech Corps of Cadets sanctions over 30 additional organizations. The privilege to be a part of these activities is typically afforded to cadets in their sophomore year. Some of these organizations include:

Air Force Flyers (Air Force ROTC)
Air Force Special Operations PT [AFSOPT] (Air Force ROTC)
Alumni Team
Asian-American Cadets
Arnold Air Society (Air Force ROTC)
Black Cadet Organization
Coast Guard Auxiliary
Color Guard
Conrad Cavalry
Cyber Team
Eagle Scout Association
Gregory Guard
Esprit de Corps
Fenix
Growley Team
Hall Council
Helping Educate Regarding Orientation (HERO)
Highty-Tighties (Technically the HTs are not a corps organization but one of the regular companies of the regiment)
Historian Staff
Marksmanship Unit
Medic
Men’s and Women's Basketball
Naval Special Operations Preparatory Team (Navy ROTC)
O-Course Committee
Ordnance
Pipes and Drums
Rakt Rats
Ranger Company (Army ROTC)
Rappelling Tower Committee
Robert Edward Femoyer Service Squadron (Air Force ROTC)
Sash and Saber Honor Society
Scabbard and Blade Honor Society
Space Training Advancement and Readiness Squadron [STARS] (Air Force ROTC)
Skipper Crew
Society of American Military Engineers
VT Valor

Uniforms and awards

Uniforms
Cadets at Virginia Tech are required to wear the prescribed Uniform of the Day (UOD) from 0700-1700 Monday through Thursday and 0700-1400 on Friday. This is designated by the regimental staff and senior leadership of the Corps. Proper uniform wear and maintenance is a fundamental part of maintaining the military discipline essential to the Corps of Cadets. The ability to change out of uniforms at the end of the duty day and in particular portions of the Upper Quad is considered a privilege and likewise must be earned by a class. For first-year cadets, this typically comes late in the academic year.

While participating in a cadet's individual ROTC's activities and labs, they may change out of the Corps Uniform of the Day into the appropriate branch uniform after 1400 on Tuesdays during the fall semester. During the spring semester, ROTC uniforms may be assigned as the Uniform of the Day. Physical training uniforms for individual ROTC programs can be utilized in the mornings during which a cadet has PT.

Dress uniforms
Uniforms of this type are worn for more formal events. Ribbons, pins, and cords are authorized for wear.
Dress A
 Consists of a blue blouse, white cross-belts, and black low-quarter shoes. Trousers and service covers are dependent on the season.
 Summer - White trousers, service cover and white gloves.
 Winter - Gray trousers, blue service color and black gloves.
 Seniors in this uniform can wear additional dress items such as sashes and sabres.
Dress B
 Consists of a blue blouse and black low-quarter shoes. Trousers and service covers are dependent on the season.
 Summer - White trousers and service cover.
 Winter - Gray trousers and blue service color.
 Unlike that of Dress A, additional decorative garments and cross-belts aren't worn in Dress B.
Paletot Mess Dress
 Consists of a white blouse, white trousers, and black low-quarter shoes. Females have the option of wearing a white skirt and black pumps as an alternative.
 Designated as the formal mess uniform for all cadets, this is the most formal attire worn by the Corps and is usually reserved for banquets, balls, and ceremonies.

Service uniforms
These uniforms are the typical duty day uniforms of cadets and are worn at many different functions, usually without the expectation of strenuous physical activity which may tarnish them. Ribbons and pins are authorized for wear.
 Summer Service ("White Shirt")
 Consists of a white shirt, gray trousers, black low-quarter shoes, black belt (white for freshmen), and blue service cover. Alternatively, garrison covers may be prescribed, though this is a rare occurrence and is seldom issued.
 Winter Service ("Gray Bag")
 Consists of a gray shirt, gray trousers, black low-quarter shoes, black tie, black belt (white for freshmen), and blue service cover. Like in "White Shirt," garrison covers may be worn.

Other uniforms
 Operational Camouflage Pattern (OCPs)
 Consists of a OCP blouse, cover, and trousers as well as tan boots and a sand undershirt. Some organizations within the Corps of Cadets are authorized berets in place of traditional OCP Patrol covers.
 This uniform can be worn to all functions at which a service uniform can be assigned, in addition to duties which require physical activity. As a result, it is considered one of the most versatile uniforms.
 "Hokie Bag"
 Consists of a maroon polo shirt, khaki trousers, brown belt, and brown shoes.
 Physical Training Uniform
 Consists of a black t-shirt, black shorts, and running shoes. In the winter, additional garments such as gloves, sweatshirts, and sweatpants are issued.

Class distinguishing features
Most notably, first-year cadets in the Corps of Cadets wear a white cloth belt in their service uniforms. This belt is known as the "rat belt," after the nickname assigned to these cadets. On the last day of classes, the tradition of "My Last Damn Rat Belt" occurs when freshman cadets decorate each-others belts with signatures, slogans, and memories. This tradition is meant to signify the communal hardship shared by cadets in their first year. First-year cadets have no insignia on their covers while in MCUs. Similarly, freshmen do not have rank insignias on their uniforms (as expected of Cadet Privates) and can be distinguished by said absence. The trim of their garrison covers is black.

Typically ranking NCOs within the Corps of Cadets, sophomore and junior cadets have similar uniform appearances. In MCUs, the covers of these cadets display the Corps Crest. One can best distinguish these classes based on the sleeves of a cadet's dress uniform, as the cuffs will have gold stripes which reflect the number of years a cadet has completed. Garrison covers have a red trim for sophomores and silver trim for juniors.

Senior cadets are the officers of the Corps. Likewise, they have numerous distinguishing features which come with their uniforms. In the Dress A uniform, seniors may adorn red sashes (known as OD and OG wraps), sabres, and capes depending on the occasion. On the collar of both dress uniforms, an underclassmen typically has two circular devices known as "headlights" which designate a particular cadet's ROTC track. For seniors, these are replaced with larger gold insignias. Said insignias are also worn with a senior's service uniforms. In the Winter Service uniform ("Gray Bag"), seniors have their ties fully extended while underclassmen tuck theirs between the second and third buttons. The service cover of seniors has a gold chinstrap, which contrasts with the black chinstraps of underclassmen. Fifth-year seniors ("Skippers") have silver chinstraps. While in MCUs, senior cadets wear a gold VPI device on their covers. The trim of their garrison covers is gold.

Awards

Beverly S. Parrish Jr. Memorial Award ("Gold Cord")
The Beverly S. Parrish Jr. Memorial Award is the award presented to the company with the highest number of points at the end of any given academic year. This award is graded based on various criteria such as academic performance, recruiting efforts, cadet retention, discipline, room and uniform inspections, and drill performance. The cadets of the winning company are given a gold cord, which may be worn with dress uniforms and is the sake of its nickname. The company itself is granted a plaque and a gold steamer to be hung atop the company's guidon. The Gold Cord is the most anticipated and highly competitive award offered by the Corps, as it is the ultimate representation of all-around unit excellence within the Corps of Cadets.

Ribbons and cords
Ribbons and cords are given to cadets for a variety of achievements. This typically includes academic excellence, leadership performance, and membership in Corps organizations. Many of these awards overlap and have both a ribbon and cord associated with them. 

Ribbons and wreath devices are distributed to cadets based on one's individual grade point average (GPA). It is often the first ribbon that a first-year cadet may wear on their uniforms.
 Gold Level: 3.75 - 4.0
 Orange Level: 3.4 - 3.74
 Maroon Level: 3.0 - 3.39

Controversy
In the fall of 2019, upperclassmen of Bravo Company organized an unsanctioned, "sophomore integration," in which cadets engaged in strenuous physical exercise and were subjected to blood pinning. No charges were filed in connection to the incident on the basis that it did not fulfill the legal definition of hazing. In 2020, cadet Darrien Brown was suspended for his role in the incident and subsequently filed suit over a lack of due process.

See also

 Virginia Tech
 Highty Tighties
 Senior Military College
 Skipper Cannon

References

External links
Official VTCC Home Page
Virginia Tech Naval ROTC
Virginia Tech Air Force ROTC
Virginia Tech Army ROTC
Video: History of Skipper cannon

Virginia Tech
ROTC programs in the United States